Wagontown is an unincorporated community in West Caln Township, Chester County, Pennsylvania, United States. Wagontown has a post office with ZIP code 19376. The Hibernia House, which is listed on the National Register of Historic Places, is located near Wagontown.

Notable people 

 Rodney Linderman and Joe Genaro, members of The Dead Milkmen

References

Unincorporated communities in Chester County, Pennsylvania
Unincorporated communities in Pennsylvania